Mikuláš Konopka (born 23 January 1979 in Rimavská Sobota, Banská Bystrica) is a retired Slovak shot putter.

Konopka originally won the bronze medal at the 2002 European Indoor Championships with a personal best throw (indoor) of 20.87 metres, but tested positive for stanozolol and lost the medal. He was suspended between March 2002 and March 2004.

His personal best throw outdoor is 20.66 metres, achieved in May 2001 in Ostrava. He currently holds the Slovak indoor record with 21.57, achieved when he won the 2007 European Indoor Championships.

On 13 May 2008 he was tested positive for metandienone and subsequently received a lifetime ban from competing.

Achievements

See also
List of sportspeople sanctioned for doping offences

References

External links

1979 births
Living people
Slovak male shot putters
Athletes (track and field) at the 2000 Summer Olympics
Athletes (track and field) at the 2004 Summer Olympics
Olympic athletes of Slovakia
Doping cases in athletics
Slovak sportspeople in doping cases
Sportspeople from Rimavská Sobota